The ARA Teniente Olivieri (A-2) is a ship in service with the Argentine Navy classified as an aviso.

Homebased at Ushuaia, she  is normally assigned to operate in Antarctica during the summer campaigns in the Patrulla Antártica Naval Combinada (English: Joint Antarctic Naval Patrol) with the Chilean Navy to guarantee safety to all tourist and scientific ships that are in transit within the Antarctic Peninsula.

Service
Built in 1981 as Marsea 10 by Quality Shipyard in New Orleans, USA  as a support ship and tug for oil rigs.

In November 1987 was acquired by  the U.S. Maritime Administration.

In Argentine service, she is the first ship to bear the name of Midshipman Olivieri killed on the ARA Alferez Sobral bridge during the Falklands War. The vessel was reported active as of 2022.

References
 Official site

External links
 Pictorial at Histamar 
 Video 

1981 ships
Auxiliary ships of the Argentine Navy
Ships built in New Orleans